Click Asia Summit is an annual conference, expo, and workshop focused on Digital & Mobile Marketing, held in India. It brings together marketing professionals from across Asia to exchange ideas and showcase their services and products. The event features various keynote speakers, workshops, and networking sessions, enabling attendees to learn about the latest trends and technologies in the industry. While the event is primarily focused on Asian companies, it also attracts attendees and speakers from around the world.

2016 

The "Click Asia Summit" 2016 was held at Taj Lands End, Mumbai on the 21-22 April. "The idea is to benefit from the value that the experts bring to the table so that practitioners and brands continue with the transformation process to be able to implement effectively", says Kavita Jhunjhunwala, Event Director of Click Asia Summit.

Robert Scoble, Entrepreneur in Residence from UploadVR, was the Keynote Speaker of Click Asia Summit 2016. He said, “This is my first visit to India and am really excited to be a part of the sessions. The India marketplace is fast changing, thereby throwing open a huge opportunity.”

Click Asia Summit 2016 Speakers

2012

The "Click Asia Summit" 2012 was held on 15-17 January at the Taj Lands End, Mumbai.

The speaker lineup consisted of various experts in the field of online and social marketing from across the globe, including Shashi Tharoor, Ankit Fadia, and many others.

Workshops held included courses on SEO, Social Media, Analytics and Creativity.

2011

The first "Click Asia Summit" was held on 20-22 January 2011 at the Taj Lands End, Mumbai. The keynote speaker was Gurbaksh Chahal. And veteran Padma Shri Award-winning Indian actor, Anupam Kher coming in as the evenings guest speaker on the first day. Gillian Muessig, CEO of SEOmoz, was the keynote speaker on Day 2. On Day 3 there were 2 advanced workshop sessions; Social Media Marketing Workshop by Gaurav Mishra, Director of MSLGROUP Asia and Gillian Muessig (SEOmoz), and Advanced SEO Workshop by Bill Hunt (Back Azimuth Consulting), Benedict Hayes (Communicate2) and Rajiv Dingra (WAT Media).

Attendees

Click Asia Summit brings online, mobile, and social media marketers across the globe under one roof, helping them to share their ideas and services with the rest of the world. Professionals employed at the following types of business organizations benefit the most from this event: Large businesses, agencies, SEO companies, IT companies, small & medium businesses, and digital agencies.

References

External links 
 Click Asia Summit
 MSN Technology
 Times of India
 Indian Express
 Search Engine Journal

Technology conferences
Business conferences in India
Telecommunications in India